Vowel pointing is the inserting of signs used to indicate vowels in certain alphabets. It may refer to:
 Harakat, of Arabic diacritics
 Niqqud, of Hebrew diacritics
 Syriac diacritics
 Tehtar, of Tengwar diacritics